Scrubs (stylized as [scrubs]) is an American sitcom created by Bill Lawrence that aired from October 2, 2001, to March 17, 2010, on NBC and later ABC. The series follows the lives of employees at the fictional Sacred Heart Hospital, which is a teaching hospital. The title is a play on surgical scrubs and a term for a low-ranking person because at the beginning of the series, most of the main characters are medical interns.

The series was noted for its fast-paced slapstick and surreal vignettes presented mostly as the daydreams of the central character, John "J.D." Dorian, played by Zach Braff. The main cast for all but its last season consisted of Braff, Sarah Chalke, Donald Faison, Neil Flynn, Ken Jenkins, John C. McGinley, and Judy Reyes. The series featured multiple guest appearances by film actors, such as Brendan Fraser, Heather Graham, Michael J. Fox and Colin Farrell.

Although season eight's "My Finale" was conceived and filmed as a series finale, the show was eventually revived for a ninth season, subtitled Med School, with the setting moved to a medical school, and new cast members introduced. Of the original cast, only Braff, Faison, and McGinley remained regular cast members, while the others, with the exception of Reyes, made guest appearances; Kerry Bishé, Eliza Coupe, Dave Franco, and Michael Mosley became series regulars, with Bishé becoming the show's new narrator.

Scrubs, produced by the television production division of Walt Disney Television, premiered on October 2, 2001, on NBC. The series received a Peabody Award in 2006. During the seventh season, NBC announced that it would not renew the show; ABC announced it had picked up the eighth season of the series, which began airing on January 6, 2009. The ninth season premiered on December 1, 2009, and on May 14, 2010, ABC officially canceled the series.

Overview
Scrubs focuses on the unique point of view of its main character and narrator, Dr. John Michael "J.D." Dorian (Zach Braff) for the first eight seasons, with season nine being narrated by the new main character Lucy Bennett (Kerry Bishé). Most episodes feature multiple story lines thematically linked by voice-overs done by Braff, as well as the comical daydreams of J.D. According to Bill Lawrence, "What we decided was, rather than have it be a monotone narration, if it's going to be Zach's voice, we're going to do everything through J.D.'s eyes. It opened up a visual medium that those of us as comedy writers were not used to." Actors were given the chance to improvise their lines on set with encouragement by series creator Bill Lawrence, with Neil Flynn and Zach Braff being the main improvisors.

Almost every episode title for the first eight seasons begins with the word "My". Bill Lawrence says this is because each episode is Dr. John Dorian writing in his diary (revealed in the commentary on the DVD of the first-season episode "My Hero"). A few episodes are told from another character's perspective and have episode titles such as "His Story" or "Her Story". Apart from a brief period of narration from J.D. at the beginning and the end, these episodes primarily contain internal narration from other characters besides J.D. The transfer of the narration duties usually occurs at a moment of physical contact between two characters. Starting with season nine, the episode titles start with "Our..." as the focus has shifted from the perspective of J.D. to a new group of medical students. The webisodes that accompanied season eight, Scrubs: Interns, also were named "Our...".

Cast and characters

For the first eight seasons, the series featured seven main cast members, with numerous other characters recurring throughout the course of the series. Starting with the ninth season, many of the original cast left as regular characters, while four new additions were made to the main cast.
 Zach Braff portrays John Michael "J.D." Dorian, the show's protagonist and narrator. J.D. is a young physician, who begins the series as an intern. His voice-over to the series comes from his internal thoughts and often features surreal fantasies. J.D. describes himself as a "sensi", enjoying acoustic alternative music and being a lover of hugs. Over the course of the series, J.D. rises through the ranks of the hospital before leaving Sacred Heart to become the Residency Director at St. Vincent Hospital, before briefly returning to become a teacher at Winston University. J.D. has a son with ex-girlfriend Kim Briggs and a child with wife Elliot Reid.
 Sarah Chalke portrays Elliot Reid (seasons 1–8, recurring season 9), another intern and later private-practice physician. Her relationship with J.D. becomes romantic on several occasions throughout the series, resulting in them eventually marrying and having a child together. As the series progresses, despite an initial dislike of each other, she becomes friends with Carla. Elliot is driven by a neurotic desire to prove her worth to her family (in which all of the males are doctors), her peers, and herself. She is described as extremely book-smart and equally attractive, while her social abilities are somewhat lacking. Her social skills develop throughout the seasons.
 Donald Faison portrays Christopher Turk, J.D.'s best friend and surgeon, who rises from intern to chief of surgery as the series progresses. Turk and J.D. were roommates when they attended the College of William and Mary, as well as in medical school, and the two have an extremely close relationship. Turk is highly driven and competitive while always remaining loyal. During the course of the series, Turk forms a relationship with Carla; they start dating early in the series, then get married, and eventually start a family together, having two children. In season nine, he is a teacher at Winston University while continuing his duties as chief of surgery.
 Neil Flynn portrays the "Janitor" (recurring season 1, main cast seasons 2–8, guest star season 9), the hospital's custodian. An incident in the pilot episode establishes an antagonistic relationship between J.D. and him, which persists throughout the series. This tends to take the form of the Janitor pulling abusive pranks on J.D., although he has shown, several times throughout the series, that he has a good side. The Janitor's real name is not mentioned until the season eight finale when he reveals to J.D. that he is called "Glenn Matthews". Shortly after this revelation, he is addressed as and answers to "Tommy" by another member of the hospital staff, bringing his previously stated name into question. However, it was later confirmed in a Facebook video by creator Bill Lawrence that the former is indeed his true name. 
 Ken Jenkins portrays Bob Kelso (seasons 1–8, recurring season 9), Sacred Heart's chief of medicine for the first seven seasons, after which he retires; in season nine, he becomes a teacher at Winston University. While chief of medicine, Kelso is seen to be selfish, intimidating, and mean-spirited, driven primarily by the hospital's bottom line rather than the well-being of patients. It is occasionally suggested that he has a softer side, and that his meanness is a means of coping with the years of hard decisions. After his retirement in season seven, his relationship with staff at the hospital improves, becoming a regular at the hospital's coffee shop where he is entitled to "free muffins for life". He is married with a son and regularly comments on the poor state of his marriage and the activities of his homosexual son. In season nine, after the death of his wife, Kelso becomes a teacher at Winston University along with J.D., Cox, and Turk.
 John C. McGinley portrays Perry Cox, an attending physician who becomes the chief of medicine at Sacred Heart in season eight. J.D. considers Cox his mentor, despite the fact that Cox routinely criticizes him, patronizes him, and calls him female names. Cox frequently suggests that this cruel treatment is intended as conditioning for the rigors of hospital life. On rare occasions, he expresses grudging admiration and even pride at J.D.'s accomplishments. Dr. Cox is dedicated to the welfare of his patients and frequently expresses concern for them, leading to frequent arguments with Bob Kelso. In season nine, he is seen working as a professor at Winston University while continuing his duties as chief of medicine.
 Judy Reyes portrays Carla Espinosa (seasons 1–8), the hospital's head nurse. Carla is opinionated, stubborn, and domineering, but continually caring, acting as a mother figure to interns, supporting them and sticking up for them when they make mistakes. During the course of the series, Turk forms a relationship with Carla; they start dating in the first episode of the series, then get married, and eventually start a family together. She is very close to J.D., affectionately calling him "Bambi", and despite initially disliking each other, also becomes close friends with Elliot.
 Eliza Coupe portrays Denise Mahoney (recurring season 8, regular season 9), an intern at Sacred Heart Hospital in season eight. She is outspoken and brutally honest, and struggles with patient-doctor communications because of this. In season nine, she is a resident at the new Sacred Heart Hospital, as well as a student adviser and teacher's assistant at Winston University. She is romantically involved with medical student Drew Suffin.
 Kerry Bishé portrays Lucy Bennett (season 9), a medical student at Winston University. She is the protagonist of season nine, initially sharing the narrating duties of the show with J.D. before taking over completely. She, like J.D., also has surreal fantasies. She loves horses and is romantically involved with a fellow student, Cole Aaronson.
 Michael Mosley portrays Drew Suffin (season 9), a medical student at Winston University. Though few details are ever given, Drew's dark past is often alluded to, including a previous burn-out at medical school. He is in a relationship with Denise Mahoney.
 Dave Franco portrays Cole Aaronson (season 9), an arrogant medical student at Winston University whose family donated a large amount of money to get the new Sacred Heart Hospital built and as such, believes that he is untouchable. After being diagnosed with skin cancer and subsequently going into remission after successful surgery, Cole rethinks his life and decides to specialize in surgery. He is in a relationship with Lucy Bennett.

Episodes

The first season introduces John Michael "J.D." Dorian and his best friend Christopher Turk in their first year out of medical school as interns at Sacred Heart Hospital. J.D. meets his reluctant mentor Perry Cox; an attractive female intern named Elliot, on whom he develops a crush; the hospital's janitor, who goes out of his way to make J.D.'s life difficult; Chief of Medicine Dr. Bob Kelso, who is more concerned about the budget than the patients; and Carla Espinosa, the head nurse who eventually becomes Turk's girlfriend. The characters face romance and relationship issues, family obligations, overwhelming paperwork, long shifts, dealing with death of patients, and conflicting pressures from senior doctors.

The second season follows J.D.'s second year practicing medicine at Sacred Heart where Elliot, Turk, and he are now residents. As the season develops, money issues affect the three of them, especially Elliot, whose dad cut her off. J.D.'s older brother Dan (Tom Cavanagh) comes to visit, as does Turk's brother Kevin (D.L. Hughley). Season two focuses on the romantic relationships of the main characters: Turk proposes to an indecisive Carla, who has doubts about if Turk is mature enough; Elliot dates nurse Paul Flowers (Rick Schroder); and Dr. Cox dates pharmaceutical rep Julie (Heather Locklear) before reigniting a relationship with his pregnant ex-wife Jordan (Christa Miller). J.D., meanwhile, attempts a relationship with Elliot, and later falls for Jamie (Amy Smart), the wife of one of his coma patients.

As the third season opens, Elliot decides to change her image with some help from the Janitor. J.D.'s undeniable crush on Elliot emerges again, but J.D. instead begins a relationship with Jordan's sister Danni (Tara Reid), who is also dealing with feelings for her ex. Turk and Carla are engaged and planning their wedding. Turk, along with Todd and the other surgical residents, deal with new attending surgeon Grace Miller (Bellamy Young), who dislikes Turk and considers him sexist. Cox and Jordan are doing well with their relationship and their son Jack, although Cox develops a schoolboy crush on Dr. Miller. He also struggles with the death of his best friend, Jordan's brother. Elliot gets into a serious relationship with Sean Kelly (Scott Foley) and tries to maintain a long-distance relationship while he is in New Zealand for six months. J.D. eventually convinces Elliot to break up with Sean to date him, only to realize, once he has her, that he does not actually love her. Their relationship lasts three days. The season ends with Turk and Carla's wedding, which Turk misses due to surgery and a church mix-up.

In season four, J.D. finishes his residency and becomes a full-blown colleague of Cox, although their dynamic does not change much. As the season opens, Turk arrives from his honeymoon with Carla, but they soon start having issues when Carla tries to change many things about her new husband. Their marriage and Turk's friendship with J.D. experience friction when J.D. and Carla share a drunken kiss. Dr. Cox and Jordan learn that their divorce was not final, but this is not necessarily all good news. Elliot is still angry with J.D. for breaking her heart, and the situation becomes more uncomfortable still when she dates J.D.'s brother. J.D. has a new love interest of his own when a new and very attractive psychiatrist, Dr. Molly Clock (Heather Graham), arrives at Sacred Heart. Molly also serves as Elliot's mentor during her time at the hospital.

Season five starts with J.D. living in a hotel, sorting out apartment issues. Elliot is dating Jake who builds her confidence up so she applies for, and gets, a new fellowship in another hospital. Turk and Carla are trying to have a baby, despite Turk's still having doubts. Finally, new interns have arrived to Sacred Heart, chief among them being Keith Dudemeister (Travis Schuldt), who soon becomes Elliot's new boyfriend, much to J.D.'s dissatisfaction. J.D. is cast in the role of expecting father, discovering at the very end of the season that his girlfriend, Dr. Kim Briggs (Elizabeth Banks), is pregnant with his child.

The sixth season has J.D. and the other characters mature to fill the different roles required of them. Turk and Carla become parents when Carla gives birth to their daughter Isabella. Elliot plans her wedding to Keith, although J.D. and she still harbor feelings for each other. Dr. Cox, as father of two children with Jordan, struggles to prevent his foul disposition from affecting his parenting.

In season seven, J.D. and Elliot struggle once again to deny their feelings for each other, despite Elliot soon to be marrying Keith and J.D. to have his first son with Kim, while the Janitor may have a new girlfriend. Bob Kelso's job is put on the line as he turns 65 years old. J.D.'s brother Dan also returns to town.

The eighth season has Kelso's replacement, Taylor Maddox (Courteney Cox), arrive; she quickly makes a lot of changes, affecting the way doctors treat patients. Elliot and J.D. finally discuss their true feelings for each other and again become a couple. Janitor and Lady (Kit Pongetti) marry, while Cox is promoted to chief of medicine to replace the dismissed Dr. Maddox, with some encouragement from Kelso. Kelso and Dr. Cox become friends, and J.D. prepares to leave Sacred Heart to move closer to his son, with Elliot. Turk is promoted to chief of surgery at Sacred Heart.

Coinciding with season eight, the webisode series Scrubs: Interns was launched, focusing around the eighth season's medical interns, Sonja "Sunny" Dey (Sonal Shah), Denise (Eliza Coupe), Katie (Betsy Beutler), and Howie (Todd Bosley). The interns learn from various characters of the show about life in the hospital.

The ninth season takes place over a year after season eight's finale. The old Sacred Heart hospital has been torn down and rebuilt. Cox, Dorian, and Turk are now Winston University medical school professors whose students occasionally rotate through the new Sacred Heart. Between the end of season eight and the beginning of season nine, the Janitor has left the hospital after being told that J.D. was not returning, and Elliot and J.D. have married and are expecting their first child. J.D.'s stay at the university is short, and he leaves the series after six episodes, reappearing in episode 9, "Our Stuff Gets Real", as a secondary character. Kelso's wife passes away, and Ted quits Sacred Heart to travel around the U.S. with his girlfriend.

Production
The origin for the show is loosely based on Dr. Jonathan Doris' experiences as a resident in internal medicine at Brown Medical School, which served as inspiration for college friend and show creator Bill Lawrence.

Scrubs was produced by ABC, through its production division, though it was aired by rival broadcaster NBC. According to show runner Lawrence, the arrangement was unusual, at least for 2007: "The show is a dinosaur, on one network and completely owned by another" and, since it is now in syndication, making a "ton of money for Touchstone." Lawrence confirmed ABC would have broadcast the seventh season had NBC refused to do so.

Main crew
The show's creator, Bill Lawrence, was also an executive producer and the showrunner. He wrote 14 episodes and directed 17. Neil Goldman and Garrett Donovan co-wrote 13 episodes during their eight-year run on the show, starting as co-producers on the show and ending as executive producers; they left the show after the eighth season. Mike Schwartz, who also played Lloyd the Delivery Guy, wrote 13 episodes during the first eight seasons; he started out as a story editor and became co-executive producer in season six. Janae Bakken and Debra Fordham were writers and producers during the first eight seasons, each writing 16 episodes. Other notable writers who started in the first season include Mark Stegemann, who wrote 14 episodes and directed two episodes during the first eight seasons; Gabrielle Allan, who wrote 11 episodes during the first four seasons and was co-executive producer; Eric Weinberg, who wrote 11 episodes during the first six seasons and was co-executive producer; Matt Tarses, who wrote eight episodes during the first four seasons and was co-executive producer. Notable writers who joined in the second season include Tim Hobert, who wrote 11 episodes from seasons two to six, and became executive producer in season five. Angela Nissel wrote 10 episodes from seasons two to eight, starting out as a staff writer and became supervising producer in season seven. Bill Callahan joined the show in season four, writing eight episodes from seasons four to eight; he became executive producer in season six.

Adam Bernstein, who directed the pilot episode, "My First Day", also directed 11 episodes up until season seven. Michael Spiller directed the most episodes, 20 during the entire series run. Ken Whittingham and Chris Koch both directed 12 episodes from seasons two to nine. Comedian Michael McDonald, who also appeared on the show, directed five episodes. Show star Zach Braff directed seven episodes of the show, including the landmark 100th episode "My Way Home", which won a Peabody Award in April 2007. In 2009, Josh Bycel, a writer and supervising producer for the animated comedy American Dad!, joined the crew as a new executive producer for the ninth season.

Medical advisors
Scrubs writers worked with several medical advisors, including doctors Jonathan Doris, Jon Turk, and Dolly Klock. Their names serve as the basis for the names of characters John Dorian, Chris Turk, and Molly Clock (played by Braff, Faison, and Heather Graham, respectively). In the season eight finale "My Finale", the "real J.D.", Jonathan Doris, made a cameo appearance as the doctor who said "adios" to J.D.
In addition, the show creator said that every single medical story on the show was handed to them by real physicians, whose names would then be written into the show. The show never used real patients’ names, but Lawrence and his writers would make sure the doctors’ names were written into the episodes.

Filming location and Sacred Heart Hospital

In the show, Sacred Heart is an inner-city teaching hospital located in Greater Sacramento, California. The first eight seasons of Scrubs were filmed on location at the North Hollywood Medical Center, a decommissioned hospital located at 12629 Riverside Drive in North Hollywood.

The production of Scrubs took complete control of the hospital, with the existing hospital rooms reworked to be more production-friendly. This involved knocking down various walls to create larger, more open spaces such as the main ward and the communal areas like admissions, which did not originally exist. Production designer Cabot McMullen also introduced more glass walls and windows around the hospital sets, as well as putting in nurses stations, which could be easily moved to allow different camera movements. While much of the building was renovated, the team were very keen to preserve the state of disrepair which the hospital was in, to give the show a more gritty, dank aesthetic.

Other recurring locations were also built into the hospital, including J.D. and Turk's apartment, a bar which they frequent and Dr. Cox's apartment–which was built in an old operating room. As well as these permanent locations, the production team would also often construct temporary sets as required, also within the hospital. Almost all of the team responsible for the show were housed within the hospital; this included all of the writers, production and casting team. Post-production was also handled in the building, with an editing suite and a sound-studio for ADR.

Instead of the more traditional artist trailers for the cast to retreat to during breaks, they were instead all given old hospital rooms as well as a small allowance to decorate them. In some instances when either filming went on late, or the cast and crew went out after work, some, such as John C. McGinley would go and sleep in their dressing room at the hospital instead of going home. Cast and crew on the show refer to the location as "San DiFrangeles"—a portmanteau of San Diego, San Francisco, and Los Angeles that is meant to encompass a large part of California. In season four's episode nine, "My Malpractice Decision", Turk's new phone number has the Sacramento area code 916. For the ninth season, the show moved to Culver Studios. The building used for the exteriors of the new Sacred Heart Hospital is located at the intersection of Ince Boulevard and Lindblade Street in Culver City, California.

WGA strike and network change
On November 5, 2007, the Writers Guild of America went on strike, which put the production of the show's seventh season on hold. When the strike started, only 11 of Scrubs 18 planned seventh-season episodes had been finished. Lawrence refused to cross any WGA picket lines to serve any of his duties for the show, so ABC Studios had non-WGA members finish episode 12, which the studio had unsuccessfully pressured Lawrence to rewrite as a series finale prior to the strike.

During the strike, NBC announced that The Office and Scrubs would be replaced by Celebrity Apprentice. NBC later announced that they would leave Scrubs on hiatus for the time being and fill the 8–9 pm timeslot with various specials and repeats.

Episode 11, "My Princess", was eventually filmed, although Lawrence was absent. Filming of episode 11 was disrupted by picketers. It was believed that Lawrence had tipped the picketers off about the filming schedule, although these beliefs turned out to be false as Lawrence quickly drove to the set to "keep the peace". After the strike ended, Lawrence announced that the final episodes of Scrubs would be produced, although at the time, he was unsure where or how they would be distributed.

Switch to ABC
Amid strike-induced doubt involving the final episodes of Scrubs, on February 28, 2008, The Hollywood Reporter reported that ABC was in talks with corporate sibling ABC Studios with the aim of bringing Scrubs to ABC for an eighth season of 18 episodes, despite Lawrence and Braff's protests that the seventh season would definitely be the last. Just hours later, Variety reported that NBC was lashing out and threatening legal action against ABC Studios. McGinley confirmed that he had been told to report back to work on March 24, 2008, to begin production for another season. On March 12, 2008, McGinley was also quoted as saying that the show's long-rumored move from NBC to ABC was a done deal, and that Scrubs would air on ABC during the 2008–09 TV season as a midseason replacement.

On March 19, 2008, Michael Ausiello of TV Guide reported that although nothing was "official", the Scrubs cast was to report back to work the following Wednesday for work on a season "unofficial" as yet. Zach Braff posted in his blog on Myspace, on April 28, 2008, that an eighth season consisting of 18 episodes was under production, but that he could not say where it would be aired. He then stated, on May 7, 2008, that the May 8 episode would be the final NBC-aired episode of Scrubs, which was followed by a bulletin on his Myspace, on May 12, confirming that Scrubss eighth season would be moving to ABC.

Season eight

On May 13, 2008, ABC announced that Scrubs would be a midseason replacement, airing Tuesday nights at 9:00 pm EST. Steve McPherson, ABC's President of Entertainment, also stated that additional seasons of Scrubs beyond the eighth could be produced if it performs well. In late November, ABC announced Scrubs would resume with back-to-back episodes on January 6, 2009, at 9:00 pm EST.

Creator Bill Lawrence described season eight as more like the first few seasons in tone, with increased focus on more realistic storylines, accompanied by the introduction of new characters. Courteney Cox joined the cast as the new chief of medicine, Dr. Maddox, for a three-episode arc. The eighth season includes webisodes and is the first Scrubs season broadcast in high definition.

Sarah Chalke was hoping that J.D. and Elliot would end up back together, comparing them to Friends characters Ross and Rachel, which has been addressed a few times on the show. In the early episodes of the season, they did rekindle their relationship, and continued dating through the end of the season. Several actors who guest starred as patients at Sacred Heart during the course of Scrubs returned for the finale.

The double-length season eight finale, "My Finale", aired on May 6, 2009, and was expected to be the series finale, as well. However, it soon became clear that the show would return for a ninth season.

Season nine

On April 16, 2009, Bill Lawrence wrote on the ABC.com message boards that a ninth season of Scrubs was still "50/50". On April 28, it was announced that ABC was in talks to renew Scrubs for another year.

Lawrence also stated that Scrubs as it was is over, for the show to move forward with a new cast in an ER type role on ABC, or take a new title completely. In response to criticisms that the change would tarnish Scrubs legacy, Lawrence defended the decision, as it would allow the Scrubs crew to continue work through a recession: "'Legacy shmegacy.' I'm really proud of the show, I'll continue to be proud of the show, but I love all of those people..."

On June 19, 2009, it was announced that the ninth season of Scrubs would "shift from the hospital to the classroom and make med-school professors of John C. McGinley's Dr. Cox and Donald Faison's Turk." According to Lawrence, the ninth season would "be a lot like Paper Chase as a comedy," with Cox's and Turk's students occasionally rotating through the halls of Sacred Heart and encountering former series regulars. McGinley and Faison were joined by "a quartet of newbies (most of them playing students)" as full-time regulars, while one of the freshmen "will be fairly famous."

Of the seven actors who had appeared in the show since the pilot, only Faison and McGinley retained their roles as regulars. Zach Braff returned part-time and was absent for the majority of the season, while retaining lead billing for six episodes. Sarah Chalke returned for four episodes as a guest star; Ken Jenkins, credited as a guest star, appeared in nine of the 13 episodes; Neil Flynn appeared in the season premiere in a brief cameo; Judy Reyes was the only former star not to return to the show. In an interview on the YouTube series Made Man, John C. McGinley stated that the reason for some cast members not returning was that they demanded higher salaries. Although he did not confirm which cast members, he did specify that two of the original cast made demands; hence, they were not brought back.

The new main cast included Eliza Coupe returning to the recurring role of Denise "Jo" Mahoney from season eight, Dave Franco as Cole, a charming, confidently stupid, and incredibly entitled medical student whose family donated the money to build the school, Kerry Bishé as Lucy, who shared the starring role with Braff in the beginning of the season and eventually became the show's new narrator, and Michael Mosley as Drew, a 30-year-old med student on his last attempt at school.

Production for the final season took place at Culver Studios.

Cancellation
On May 14, 2010, it was officially announced that the show was canceled. The season nine finale, titled "Our Thanks", aired on March 17, 2010. Five days later, on March 22, 2010, Zach Braff announced, via the official Facebook page, that the ninth season of Scrubs would be the last, commenting that, "Many of you have asked, so here it is: it appears that 'New Scrubs', 'Scrubs 2.0', 'Scrubs with New Kids', 'Scrubbier', 'Scrubs without JD' is no more. It was worth a try, but alas... it didn't work."

Crossovers
Zach Braff, Sarah Chalke, Judy Reyes, John C. McGinley and Neil Flynn reprised their roles as J.D., Elliot Reid, Carla Espinosa, Perry Cox, and the Janitor to make a cameo appearance in the 2002 Muppets film It's a Very Merry Muppet Christmas Movie, trying to reanimate Miss Piggy. Eventually, Piggy and the Scrubs cast break the fourth wall, with the actors portraying themselves and Bill Lawrence appearing as himself/the director of the current episode.

Sam Lloyd reprised his role as Ted Buckland in the season two finale of the Lawrence series Cougar Town. In the episode, written and directed by Lawrence, Ted is in Hawaii and says his girlfriend, Stephanie Gooch, has run off with Dr. Hooch. Lloyd reprised his role again in a season three episode which also featured Ken Jenkins, Robert Maschio, Zach Braff, Christa Miller, Sarah Chalke, and the Worthless Peons in cameo appearances at the end of the episode.

Cinematography and delivery format
The show is shot with a single instead of multiple-camera setup more typical for sitcoms. The season four episode "My Life in Four Cameras", has a brief multiple-camera style, since it includes J.D.'s fantasies of life being more like a traditional sitcom.

John Inwood, the cinematographer of the series, shot the series with his own Aaton XTR prod Super16 film camera. Despite the fact that some broadcasters, such as the BBC, consider Super 16 a "non-HD" format, John Inwood believed that footage from his camera was not only sufficient to air in high definition, but it also "looked terrific." The intro of the first season, which was broadcast in 4:3, has been reused in an HD version for season eight without any further change.

Except for the finale of season five, "My Transition", which was broadcast in high definition, the first seven seasons of the show have been broadcast in standard definition with a 4:3 aspect ratio. After the show was moved from NBC to ABC, the broadcast format for new episodes changed to high definition and widescreen. John Inwood opined that older episodes could be rereleased that way, as well. From the very beginning, he filmed the show with widescreen delivery in mind so the whole series could be aired in widescreen when the market evolved.

All nine seasons have been released on DVD in 4:3 format. However, the eighth season was also released on Blu-ray Disc in the original widescreen format.

Music
Music plays a large role in Scrubs. A wide variety of rock, pop, and indie artists are featured, and almost every episode ends with a musical montage summing up the themes and plot lines of the episode, and the music for these montages is often picked even before the episodes are completely written.

Members of the cast and crew were encouraged to contribute song suggestions, with many ideas coming from series creator Bill Lawrence, writer Neil Goldman, and actors Zach Braff (whose college friends Cary Brothers and Joshua Radin appear on the Scrubs soundtrack) and Christa Miller (who selected Colin Hay and Tammany Hall NYC). According to Lawrence, "Christa picks so much of the music for the show that a lot of the writers and actors don't even go to me anymore when they have a song. They hand it to her."

Featured songs present in the original broadcasts appear unaltered in the DVD release of the show. However, a handful of songs were replaced in the versions released to streaming services such as Netflix and Hulu due to licensing issues.

Scrubs featured a musical episode in the sixth season, "My Musical", guest-starring Tony-nominated Avenue Q actress Stephanie D'Abruzzo. The episode was nominated for five Emmy Awards, winning one.

Theme song
The theme song of the series, performed by Lazlo Bane, is titled "Superman", and can be found on the album All the Time in the World, as well as on the first Scrubs soundtrack. Lawrence credits Braff for finding and suggesting "Superman" as the theme song, with the specific lyric "I'm no Superman" serving as an allusion to the fallibility of the lead characters.

The Scrubs main title is performed at a faster tempo than the original recording of the song. The original, slower recording was used briefly at the beginning of season two, played during an extended version of the title sequence, as well as the opening for "My Urologist", and a special edit of the title sequence for resulting in roughly 1–2 seconds of music, followed by the line "I'm no Superman", accompanied by a quick flash of credits. The original introduction from season one was used through most of season three and then used for seasons four through eight. Beginning with season nine, a new version of "Superman" is used which is performed by WAZ.

Soundtracks

Three official soundtracks have been released. The first soundtrack, Music From Scrubs, was released on CD on September 24, 2002. The second soundtrack, Scrubs Original Soundtrack Vol. 2, was released exclusively on iTunes on May 9, 2006. The third soundtrack, "My Musical" Soundtrack, featured the music composed and performed in musical episode "My Musical"; it was released on Amazon.com and iTunes on August 7, 2007.

Featured musical contributors
Colin Hay, the former frontman of Men at Work, has had music featured in at least seven episodes, and has appeared in the episode "My Overkill", performing the song "Overkill" as a street musician, and in the episode "My Hard Labor" performing "Down Under". Hay also sings "Where Everybody Knows Your Name", the theme from Cheers, in the episode "My Life in Four Cameras" and the episode "My Philosophy" features Hay's song "Waiting For My Real Life To Begin", sung by several members of the cast. He also appeared in "My Finale".

The music of Joshua Radin, who is a friend of Scrubs star Zach Braff, appeared in six episodes.

Music by Keren DeBerg has featured in 15 episodes, and she appeared in "My Musical" as an extra in the song "All Right".

Clay Aiken appeared in the episode "My Life in Four Cameras" and performed the song "Isn't She Lovely?" by Stevie Wonder.

The Worthless Peons

The Worthless Peons (also known as Ted's Band, The Blanks, or in the "My Way Home" Director's Cut, as "Foghat") are an a cappella group made up of Sacred Heart hospital employees from different departments. They are a cover band, and often sing songs from a specific genre (for example, cartoon theme songs or commercial jingles).

The Worthless Peons are played by The Blanks, who are a real-life a cappella band made up of Sam Lloyd (who plays Ted), George Miserlis, Paul F. Perry, and Philip McNiven. The Blanks' album, Riding the Wave, features guest appearances from Lawrence and members of the Scrubs cast. This band was put on the show when Sam Lloyd brought his a cappella band to the Scrubs cast Christmas party. Lloyd told Lawrence about his band, and Lawrence got the idea of putting them in the show.

The Worthless Peons also sing the theme song to the web series Scrubs: Interns, which features the new interns from season eight learning about the hospital in the same way that J.D. did in season one. Interns is aired on the ABC website.

Title sequence
The chest X-ray featured at the end of the title sequence was hung backwards for most of the first five seasons. Lawrence has stated that having the X-ray backwards was intentional as it signified that the new interns were inexperienced. During Zach Braff's audio commentary on "My Last Chance", he states that the error was actually unintentional. The error became somewhat infamous and was even parodied in "My Cabbage".

An attempt was made to fix the error in the extended title sequence used at the beginning of season two that included Neil Flynn, but the extended sequence (including corrected X-ray) was soon scrapped due to fan and network request. Finally, in "My Urologist", Dr. Kim Briggs steps into the credits and switches the X-ray around, saying, "That's backwards; it's been bugging me for years". At the beginning of season eight, when the series switched to ABC, the chest X-ray was once again backwards.

The ninth season features a new title sequence with a new version of the theme song "Superman" performed by WAZ. The new title sequences features the four new characters–Denise, Lucy, Drew, and Cole, as well as Dr. Cox and Turk, while J.D. is seen at the end placing the chest X-ray. In all season nine episodes that do not feature J.D., he is absent from the title sequence and Lucy is the one placing the X-ray. The X-ray at the end of the sequence is also not backwards and the subtitle "Med School" appears at the end of the sequence.

Podcast 
On March 31, 2020, Zach Braff and Donald Faison launched their Scrubs-themed podcast Fake Doctors, Real Friends in partnership with iHeartRadio in which Braff and Faison rewatch each episode and give behind-the-scenes details on the series.

Reception

Critical reception

First eight seasons
Throughout its original run, Scrubs received critical acclaim, with many critics praising its cast, characters, and humor (especially J.D.'s fantasy sequences). In 2006, Entertainment Weeklys website EW.com gave the overall series (the review was made early after the fifth-season premiere) a grade of "A−", with the author saying "Scrubs is the trickiest comedy on TV [...] A likable, daffy, buoyant series that would be a big annoying mess if it weren't done just right, Scrubs is the very definition of nimble". IGN gave the first season a perfect score of 10. The seven following seasons were rated, respectively, 9, 9, 9, 8, 7.5, 8.3 and 7.5.

The Truth About Nursing, which checks the realism of the medical series, gave Scrubs a "Nursing rating" of 1.5 out of 4 stars, but an "Artistic rating" of 3 out of 4 stars, praising that "despite the nasty and surreal elements, its characters are not above learning or growing, as they try to cope with the very real stresses of life and death at the hospital". However, the reviewer stated, "The show's portrayal of nursing has been less impressive".

Review aggregate Metacritic only assigned an average score to the eighth and ninth seasons, with the eighth season scoring 79/100, based on four reviews only (all positives), indicating "Generally favorable reviews".

Ninth season
The ninth and final season received mixed reviews, with many critics heavily criticizing the new cast; it received a score of 64/100 on Metacritic, indicating "Generally favorable reviews". An IGN editor gave it a positive score of 7 out of 10, stating "even though this was not the best season, I'll always have fond memories of the show".

USA Today reviewer Robert Bianco wrote a negative review, stating "The result is a deadly, deal-driven mistake that takes a network that has made great sitcom strides forward one unfortunate step back". He also noted that the presence of a few members of the original cast (Braff, Faison, and John C. McGinley) "only makes it harder for the new characters to take hold" (despite his additional criticism of Braff's performance). Blogcritics gave it a mixed review, criticizing the new cast, but praising the performances by the original cast members.

Awards and nominations

Scrubs received 17 Emmy nominations, in categories such as casting, cinematography, directing, editing, and writing, winning only two. Its fourth season earned the series its first nomination for Outstanding Comedy Series. Zach Braff was also nominated that year for Outstanding Lead Actor in a Comedy Series. The series was nominated again the following year for Outstanding Comedy Series. At the 59th Primetime Emmy Awards, the episode "My Musical" was nominated for five awards in four categories: Outstanding Directing for a Comedy Series (Will Mackenzie), Outstanding Music Direction (Jan Stevens) and Outstanding Original Music and Lyrics ("Everything Comes Down to Poo" and "Guy Love"); while sharing the award for Outstanding Sound Mixing for a Comedy or Drama Series (Half-Hour) And Animation (Joe Foglia, Peter J. Nusbaum, and John W. Cook II) with Entourage.

Braff was nominated for the Golden Globe award for Best Actor in a Television Series, Comedy or Musical in 2005, 2006, and 2007.

The show won the 2002, 2008, and 2009 Humanitas Prize, an award created for rewarding human dignity, meaning, and freedom. It also won a Peabody Award.

References

External links

 

2000s American comedy-drama television series
2000s American medical television series
2000s American single-camera sitcoms
2000s American workplace comedy television series
2000s American workplace drama television series
2001 American television series debuts
2010 American television series endings
2010s American comedy-drama television series
2010s American medical television series
2010s American single-camera sitcoms
2010s American workplace comedy television series
2010s American workplace drama television series
American Broadcasting Company original programming
American television series revived after cancellation
English-language television shows
Metafictional television series
NBC original programming
Peabody Award-winning television programs
 
American surreal comedy television series
Television series by ABC Studios
Television series created by Bill Lawrence (TV producer)
Television shows set in California